Tyler Burton (born February 11, 2000) is an American college basketball player for the Richmond Spiders of the Atlantic 10 Conference (A-10).

High school career
Burton played five years of varsity basketball for Marianapolis Preparatory School in Thompson, Connecticut under head coach Andrew Vitale. He experienced a growth spurt as a sophomore, and opted to reclassify, repeating his freshman year despite sufficient academic achievement. He was named New England Preparatory School Athletic Council Class B Player of the Year in his junior and senior seasons. Burton committed to playing college basketball for Richmond after developing a close connection with assistant coach Marcus Jenkins, choosing the Spiders over offers from St. Bonaventure, Rhode Island and Siena.

College career
As a freshman at Richmond, Burton averaged 4.6 points and 3.9 rebounds per game. He entered the starting lineup as a sophomore due to a season-ending injury to Nick Sherod prior to the season. Burton averaged 12 points and 7.6 rebounds per game, and was named Atlantic 10 Most Improved Player. He assumed an expanded role in his junior season with the departure of Blake Francis. On November 20, 2021, Burton recorded 30 points and nine rebounds in a 73–70 loss to Drake. On February 4, 2022, he scored a career-high 36 points in a 71–61 victory over St. Bonaventure. Burton was named to the Second Team All-Atlantic 10. As a junior, he averaged 16.1 points and 7.7 rebounds per game. On April 6, 2022, Burton declared for the 2022 NBA draft while maintaining his college eligibility.

Career statistics

College

|-
| style="text-align:left;"| 2019–20
| style="text-align:left;"| Richmond
| 30 || 1 || 14.1 || .450 || .263 || .750 || 3.9 || .3 || .6 || .5 || 4.6
|-
| style="text-align:left;"| 2020–21
| style="text-align:left;"| Richmond
| 23 || 23 || 30.9 || .449 || .363 || .803 || 7.6 || .5 || 1.1 || .6 || 12.0
|-
| style="text-align:left;"| 2021–22
| style="text-align:left;"| Richmond
| 37 || 37 || 33.0 || .457 || .365 || .791 || 7.7 || 1.0 || 1.1 || .5 || 16.1
|- class="sortbottom"
| style="text-align:center;" colspan="2"| Career
| 90 || 61 || 26.2 || .454 || .351 || .789 || 6.4 || .6 || .9 || .5 || 11.2

Personal life
Burton's father, Quinton, played college basketball for Providence.

References

External links
Richmond Spiders bio

2000 births
Living people
American men's basketball players
Basketball players from Massachusetts
People from Uxbridge, Massachusetts
Richmond Spiders men's basketball players
Small forwards